David Bruce Lundquist Jr. (born June 4, 1973) is an American former professional baseball pitcher and current bullpen coach for the Philadelphia Phillies of Major League Baseball (MLB). During his big league playing career, Lundquist pitched for the Chicago White Sox and San Diego Padres.

Lundquist attended the University of Nevada, Las Vegas and was drafted by the White Sox in the fifth round of the 1993 Major League Baseball draft. He made his MLB debut in 1999.

Amateur career

Lundquist was born in Beverly, Massachusetts. He attended and pitched for the University of Nevada, Las Vegas.

Professional career

Chicago White Sox
He went 5-3 with a 3.14 ERA in 11 games, 10 starts.

In  Lundquist played for the Class-A Hickory Crawdads of the South Atlantic League. He went 13-10 with a 3.48 ERA and 133 strikeouts in 27 games, all starts. He also pitched two shutouts.

Lundquist spent the  season with the Class-A South Bend Silver Hawks of the Midwest League. In 18 starts, Lundquist went 8-4 with a 3.58 ERA and 60 strikeouts in 118 innings pitched. Lundquist pitched five complete games and one shutout.

The next season, saw Lundquist a promotion to the Class-A Advanced Prince William Cannons but an injury had him demoted to the Rookie-Level Gulf Coast League White Sox. He went a combined 1-3 with a 4.65 ERA in eight games, all starts.

In  Lundquist played for the Class-A Advanced Winston-Salem Warthogs of the Carolina League and the Double-A Birmingham Barons of the Southern League. Lundquist went a combined 3-1 with a 7.19 ERA and 54 strikeouts in 27 games, six starts. For the first time in his professional career, Lundquist pitched mainly in relief.

Lundquist played the  season at three different levels of the White Sox organization, playing for the Class-A Advanced Winston-Salem Warthogs, the Double-A Birmingham Barons and the Triple-A Calgary Cannons. He went a combined 5-1 with a 3.24 ERA in 51 games, all in relief. Lundquist finished the season with 12 saves, his first career season with any saves.

 saw Lundquist his first taste of the Major Leagues. He started the season with the Triple-A Charlotte Knights of the International League where in three games, he gave up no runs. He made his first Major League appearance on April 6,  against the Seattle Mariners giving up no runs in one inning. Lundquist was soon placed on waivers after 17 games.

Kansas City Royals and Aberdeen Arsenal
Lundquist was claimed of waivers by the Kansas City Royals on October 15, 1999. He was released by the Royals on March 29,  before making an appearance.

In 2000 Lundquist played for the Independent Aberdeen Arsenal of the Atlantic League. He went 4-3 with a 9.07 ERA in 21 games, all in relief.

San Diego Padres
Lundquist was signed by the San Diego Padres on February 8, . He spent the '01 season with the Triple-A Portland Beavers of the Pacific Coast League. He went 4-7 with a 3.11 ERA in 50 games. Lundquist lead all Beavers relief pitchers in ERA and games pitched. He also pitched 17 games at the Major League level and went 0-1 with a 5.95 ERA and 19 strikeouts in 19 innings. He was granted free agency on October 15, 2001 but re-signed on October 22.

In  Lundquist started the season with the Triple-A Portland Beavers where he went 1-4 with a 5.62 ERA in 30 games. His 21 saves lead all Beavers pitchers. Lundquist spent three games with the Padres at the Major League level giving up five earned runs in just 2 innings. He was released on July 15, 2002.

Pittsburgh Pirates
Lundquist signed with the Pittsburgh Pirates on February 9,  and spent the '04 season with the Class-A Hickory Crawdads and the Double-A Altoona Curve. He went a combined 7-2 with a 3.40 ERA in 25 games. Lundquist failed to make it to the Major Leagues and retired after the 2004 season.

Coaching career
Lundquist was the pitching coach for the Lehigh Valley IronPigs for the 2018 season. In 2019, he is the assistant pitching coach of the Philadelphia Phillies in MLB.

References

External links

1973 births
Living people
Aberdeen Arsenal players
Altoona Curve players
American expatriate baseball players in Canada
American expatriate baseball players in Japan
Baseball coaches from Massachusetts
Baseball players from Massachusetts
Birmingham Barons players
Calgary Cannons players
Charlotte Knights players
Chicago White Sox players
Gulf Coast White Sox players
Hickory Crawdads players
Hiroshima Toyo Carp players
Major League Baseball pitchers
Major League Baseball pitching coaches
Minor league baseball coaches
People from Beverly, Massachusetts
People from Carson City, Nevada
Philadelphia Phillies coaches
Portland Beavers players
Prince William Cannons players
San Diego Padres players
South Bend Silver Hawks players
UNLV Rebels baseball players
Winston-Salem Warthogs players
Cochise Apaches baseball players